Agnete Seidelin (5 November 1874 - 4 June 1956), also credited as Agnete Seidelin-Raunkiaer was a Danish botanist noted for her study of freshwater plants.  She was married to Danish botanist Christen C. Raunkiær.

Works
 Seidelin, A. (1909) 5. Hippuridaceae, Halorrhagidaceae and Callitrichaceae, in The Structure and Biology of Arctic Flowering Plants, p. 295-332.
 Seidelin, A. (1912) Vegetationen i nogle Vandhuller i Nordvendsyssel. Botanisk Tidsskrift bd. 33.

References

1874 births
1956 deaths
Danish women scientists
20th-century Danish botanists
Danish women botanists